The list of Prince Edward Island by-elections includes every by-election held in the Canadian province of Prince Edward Island since 1873. By-elections occur whenever there is a vacancy in the Legislative Assembly, although an imminent general election may allow the vacancy to remain until the dissolution of the legislative assembly. Until 1932 incumbent members were required to recontest their seats upon being appointed to Cabinet. These Ministerial by-elections were almost always uncontested.

66th General Assembly of Prince Edward Island 2019–2023

65th General Assembly of Prince Edward Island 2015–2019

64th General Assembly of Prince Edward Island 2011–2015
no by-elections

63rd General Assembly of Prince Edward Island 2007–2011

62nd General Assembly of Prince Edward Island 2003–2007

61st General Assembly of Prince Edward Island 2000–2003

60th General Assembly of Prince Edward Island 1996–2000

59th General Assembly of Prince Edward Island 1993–1996
no by-elections

58th General Assembly of Prince Edward Island 1989–1993

57th General Assembly of Prince Edward Island 1986–1989

56th General Assembly of Prince Edward Island 1982–1986

55th General Assembly of Prince Edward Island 1979–1982

54th General Assembly of Prince Edward Island 1978–1979
no by-elections

53rd General Assembly of Prince Edward Island 1974–1978

52nd General Assembly of Prince Edward Island 1970–1974

51st General Assembly of Prince Edward Island 1966–1970
no by-elections

50th General Assembly of Prince Edward Island 1962–1966

49th General Assembly of Prince Edward Island 1959–1962

48th General Assembly of Prince Edward Island 1955–1959

47th General Assembly of Prince Edward Island 1951–1955

46th General Assembly of Prince Edward Island 1947–1951

† Won by acclamation

45th General Assembly of Prince Edward Island 1943–1947

† Won by acclamation

44th General Assembly of Prince Edward Island 1939–1943

43rd General Assembly of Prince Edward Island 1935–1939

42nd General Assembly of Prince Edward Island 1931–1935

† Won by acclamation

41st General Assembly of Prince Edward Island 1927–1931

† Won by acclamation

40th General Assembly of Prince Edward Island 1923–1927

† Won by acclamation

39th General Assembly of Prince Edward Island 1919–1923

† Won by acclamation

38th General Assembly of Prince Edward Island 1915–1919

37th General Assembly of Prince Edward Island 1912–1915
no by-elections

36th General Assembly of Prince Edward Island 1908–1911

† Won by acclamation

35th General Assembly of Prince Edward Island 1904–1908

† Won by acclamation

34th General Assembly of Prince Edward Island 1900–1904

† Won by acclamation

33rd General Assembly of Prince Edward Island 1897–1900

† Won by acclamation

32nd General Assembly of Prince Edward Island 1893–1897

31st General Assembly of Prince Edward Island 1890–1893

† Won by acclamation

30th General Assembly of Prince Edward Island 1886–1890

† Won by acclamation

29th General Assembly of Prince Edward Island 1882–1886

28th General Assembly of Prince Edward Island 1879–1882

† Won by acclamation

27th General Assembly of Prince Edward Island 1876–1879

† Won by acclamation

26th General Assembly of Prince Edward Island 1873–1876

† Won by acclamation

See also
 List of federal by-elections in Canada

References

 
 
The Canadian parliamentary companion, 1897 JA Gemmill
The Canadian parliamentary companion, 1891 JA Gemmill
The Canadian parliamentary companion, 1889 JA Gemmill
The Canadian parliamentary companion, 1885 JA Gemmill
The Canadian parliamentary companion, 1882 CH Mackintosh
The Canadian parliamentary companion, 1879 CH Mackintosh
The Canadian parliamentary companion, 1876 Henry J. Morgan

By-elections
Provincial by-elections in Prince Edward Island
Elections, by-elections
Prince Edward Island, by-ele